As part of the local elections in Wales on 5 May 2022, the 33 seats of Blaenau Gwent County Borough Council were up for election. The previous full council election took place in May 2017.

Results summary

Labour regained a majority control of the council at the 2022 local elections. The former Independent leader of the council, Nigel Daniels, lost his seat.

Ward results

Abertillery & Six Bells

Beaufort

Blaina

Brynmawr

Cwm

Cwmtillery

Ebbw Vale North

Ebbw Vale South

 
 
 
 

A few days after being elected as an Independent, Carl Bainton changed his allegiance to Labour.

Georgetown

Llanhilleth

Nantyglo

Rassau & Garnlydan

Sirhowy

Tredegar

References

Blaenau Gwent
2022